CIPA is one of the oldest International Scientific Committees of the International Council on Monuments and Sites. It was founded in 1968 jointly with the International Society for Photogrammetry and Remote Sensing to facilitate the transfer of technology from the measurement sciences into the heritage documentation and recording disciplines. CIPA originally stood for the Comité International de Photogrammétrie Architecturale. However this name no longer describes the full scope of its activities, so CIPA Heritage Documentation was established.

CIPA Heritage Documentation is now an organization that endeavours to transfer technology from the measurement and visualisation sciences to the disciplines of cultural heritage recording, conservation and documentation. It acts as a bridge between the producers of heritage documentation, and the users of this information. Its mission is to encourage the development of principles and practices for the recording, documentation and information management for all aspects of cultural heritage; and to support and encourage the development of specialized tools and techniques in support of these activities.

Specialisations of CIPA 

The activities of the Working Groups and Task Groups are only part of the CIPA contribution to ICOMOS and ISPRS. Many of the National Delegates are active researchers with specialisations covering:

 field surveying
 laser scanning
 building surveying
 site documentation
 monument conservation
 landscape modelling
 archaeological exploration
 data base systems
 underwater recording
 information systems
 3d modelling
 close-range photogrammetry
 analysis of old photographs
 multimedia and virtual reality displays
 petroglyph and pictograph documentation

Activities

It holds an International Symposium every 2 years, either in conjunction with a major conference of the two parent organisations or as a special CIPA event. Often, accompanying these Symposia are specialist workshops dealing with specific topics. The proceedings of the Symposia are also published, either as a journal or on CD-ROM, and some papers are available from the web site. It also maintains a discussion list, where the experts provide advice and information on problems and solutions.

Membership and Participation 

Membership is open to everybody who has an interest in the documentation and preservation of cultural heritage. It also needs active participants who can contribute to the activities of the Working and Task Groups, or who can represent others in their countries as National Delegates. National Delegates need to be nominated by the local chapter of either ICOMOS or ISPRS and can attend special sessions at CIPA Symposia.

External links
Official website

International scientific organizations
Organizations established in 1968